Gerry Gratton (August 29, 1927 – July 28, 1963) was a Canadian Olympic weightlifting medallist. He won a gold medal at the 1950 British Empire Games alongside a silver at the 1952 Summer Olympics and a gold at the 1954 British Empire and Commonwealth Games. Gratton was inducted to the Canadian Olympic Hall of Fame in 1955 and Canada's Sports Hall of Fame in 2015.

Early life and education
Gerry Gratton was born on August 29, 1927 in Montreal.

Career
Gratton started his weightlifting career at the 1948 Summer Olympics where he came in fifth. At the 1950 British Empire Games, he won a gold medal in the middleweight event. Gratton followed up with a subsequent gold medal at the 1952 Summer Olympics, but he was demoted to the silver medal after an official ruling. After the Olympics, Gratton won a gold at the 1954 British Empire and Commonwealth Games in the middleweight category. Gratton was scheduled to compete at the 1956 Summer Olympics, but he was disqualified due to surpassing the weight limit. Gratton's final competition before his retirement was at the 1958 British Empire and Commonwealth Games.

Throughout his career, Gratton set weightlifting records including sharing the middle weight Olympic record at the 1952 Olympics. He was also the flag bearer for the Canadian team at the 1954 British Empire and Commonwealth Games.

Awards and honours
In 1955, Gratton was inducted into the Canadian Olympic Hall of Fame. Posthumously, he was inducted into Canada's Sports Hall of Fame in 2015.

Death
Gratton died on July 28, 1963 after succumbing to injuries from a car accident.

References

External links
 

1927 births
1963 deaths
Sportspeople from Montreal
Canadian male weightlifters
Olympic weightlifters of Canada
Weightlifters at the 1948 Summer Olympics
Weightlifters at the 1952 Summer Olympics
Olympic silver medalists for Canada
Olympic medalists in weightlifting
Medalists at the 1952 Summer Olympics
Weightlifters at the 1950 British Empire Games
Weightlifters at the 1954 British Empire and Commonwealth Games
Weightlifters at the 1958 British Empire and Commonwealth Games
Commonwealth Games gold medallists for Canada
Commonwealth Games medallists in weightlifting
Road incident deaths in Canada
Medallists at the 1950 British Empire Games
Medallists at the 1954 British Empire and Commonwealth Games